When Sweet Sleep Returned is the third studio album by American psychedelic rock band Assemble Head in Sunburst Sound, released in April 2009 on Tee Pee Records.

Track listing 

 "Two Stage Rocket" – 3:27
 "Two Birds" – 7:37
 "Drunken Leaves" – 4:18
 "The Slumbering Ones" – 4:50
 "Kolob Canyon" – 5:55 
 "By the Ripping Green" – 5:07
 "Clive and the Lyre" – 3:51
 "End Under Down" – 5:36

References

2009 albums
Assemble Head in Sunburst Sound albums
Tee Pee Records albums